Huerfano may refer to:
Huerfano County, Colorado
Huerfano, New Mexico
Huerfano Butte (Arizona)
Huerfano Butte (Colorado)
Huerfano River (Colorado)

pt:Huerfano